Stephen Paul Lawson (born 17 December 1968) is a former Zimbabwean cricketer. Born in Umtali (now Mutare), he played five first-class matches for Manicaland during the 1999–2000 Logan Cup.

References

External links
 
 

1968 births
Living people
Cricketers from Mutare
Manicaland cricketers
Zimbabwean cricketers